The Somnath temple, also called Somanātha temple or Deo Patan, is a Hindu temple located in Prabhas Patan,  Veraval in Gujarat, India. It is one of the most sacred pilgrimage sites for Hindus and is believed to be first among the twelve jyotirlinga shrines of Shiva. It is unclear when the first version of the Somnath temple was built with estimates varying between the early centuries of the 1st-millennium to about the 9th-century CE. The temple is not mentioned in ancient Sanskrit texts of Hinduism as Somnath nomenclature but the "Prabhasa-Pattana" (Prabhas Patan) is mentioned as a tirtha (pilgrimage site), where this temple exists. For example, the Mahabharata in Chapters 109, 118 and 119 of the Book Three (Vana Parva), and Sections 10.45 and 10.78 of the Bhagavata Purana state Prabhasa to be a tirtha on the coastline of Saurashtra.

The temple was reconstructed several times in the past after repeated destruction by multiple Muslim invaders and rulers, notably starting from an attack by Mahmud Ghazni in the 11th century.

The Somnath temple was actively studied by colonial era historians and archaeologists in the 19th- and early 20th-century, when its ruins illustrated a historic Hindu temple in the process of being converted into an Islamic mosque. After India's independence, those ruins were demolished and the present Somnath temple was reconstructed in the Māru-Gurjara style of Hindu temple architecture. The contemporary Somnath temple's reconstruction was started under the orders of the first Home Minister of India Vallabhbhai Patel and completed in May 1951 after his death.

Location
The Somnath temple is located along the coastline in Prabhas Patan, Veraval, Saurashtra region of Gujarat.

The Somnath temple is located close to the ancient trading port of Veraval, one of three in Gujarat from where Indian merchants departed to trade goods. The 11th-century Persian historian Al-Biruni states that Somnath has become so famous because "it was the harbor for seafaring people, and a station for those who went to and fro between Sufala in the country of Zanj (east Africa) and China". Combined with its repute as an eminent pilgrimage site, its location was well known to the kingdoms within the Indian subcontinent. Literature and epigraphical evidence suggests that the medieval era Veraval port was also actively trading with the Middle East and Southeast Asia. This brought wealth and fame to the Veraval area as well as the temple.

The site of Prabhas Patan was occupied during the Indus Valley Civilisation, 2000–1200 BCE. It was one of very few sites in the Junagadh district to be so occupied. After abandonment in 1200 BCE, it was reoccupied in 400 BCE and continued into the historical period. Prabhas is also close to the other sites similarly occupied: Junagadh, Dwarka, Padri and Bharuch.

Nomenclature and significance
Somnath means "Lord of the Soma"  or "moon". The site is also called Prabhasa ("place of splendor"). Somnath temple has been a jyotirlinga site for the Hindus, and a holy place of pilgrimage (tirtha ). It is one of five most revered sites on the seacoast of India, along with the nearby Dvaraka in Gujarat, Puri in Odisha, Rameshvaram and Chidambaram in Tamil Nadu.

Jyotirlinga 

Many Hindu texts provide a list of the most sacred Shiva pilgrimage sites, along with a guide for visiting the site. The best known were the Mahatmya genre of texts. Of these, Somnatha temple tops the list of jyotirlingas in the Jnanasamhita – chapter 13 of the Shiva Purana, and the oldest known text with a list of jyotirlingas. Other texts include the Varanasi Mahatmya (found in Skanda Purana), the Shatarudra Samhita and the Kothirudra Samhita.  All either directly mention the Somnath temple as the number one of twelve sites, or call the top temple as "Somesvara" in Saurashtra – a synonymous term for this site in these texts. The exact date of these texts is unknown, but based on references they make to other texts and ancient poets or scholars, these have been generally dated between the 10th- and 12th-century, with some dating it much earlier and others a bit later.

Scriptural Mentions
The Somnath temple is not mentioned in ancient Sanskrit texts of Hinduism, but the "Prabhasa-Pattana" is mentioned as a tirtha (pilgrimage site). For example, the Mahabharata (c. 400 CE) in Chapters 109, 118 and 119 of the Book Three (Vana Parva), and Sections 10.45 and 10.78 of the Bhagavata Purana state Prabhasa to be a tirtha on the coastline of Saurashtra.

Alf Hiltebeitel – a Sanskrit scholar known for his translations and studies on Indic texts including the Mahabharata, states that the appropriate context for the legends and mythologies in the Mahabharata are the Vedic mythologies which it borrowed, integrated and re-adapted for its times and its audience. The Brahmana layer of the Vedic literature already mention tirtha related to the Saraswati river. However, given the river was nowhere to be seen when the Mahabharata was compiled and finalized, the Saraswati legend was modified. It vanishes into an underground river, then emerges as an underground river at holy sites for sangam (confluence) already popular with the Hindus. The Mahabharata then integrates the Saraswati legend of the Vedic lore with the Prabhasa tirtha, states Hiltebeitel. The critical editions of the Mahabharata, in several chapters and books mentions that this "Prabhasa" is at a coastline near Dvaraka. It is described as a sacred site where Arjuna and Balarama go on tirtha, a site where Lord Krishna chooses to go and spends his final days, then dies.

Catherine Ludvik – a Religious Studies and Sanskrit scholar, concurs with Hiltebeitel. She states that the Mahabharata mythologies borrow from the Vedic texts but modify them from Brahmin-centered "sacrificial rituals" to tirtha rituals that are available to everyone – the intended audience of the great epic. More specifically, she states that the sacrificial sessions along the Saraswati river found in sections such as of Pancavimsa Brahmana were modified to tirtha sites in the context of the Saraswati river in sections of Vana Parva and Shalya Parva. Thus the mythology of Prabhasa in the Mahabharata, which it states to be "by the sea, near Dwaraka". This signifies an expanded context of pilgrimage as a "Vedic ritual equivalent", integrating Prabhasa that must have been already important as a tirtha site when the Vana Parva and Shalya Parva compilation was complete.

The 5th-century poem Raghuvamsa of Kalidasa mentions some of revered Shiva pilgrimage sites of his times. It includes Banaras (Varanasi), Mahakala-Ujjain, Tryambaka, Prayaga, Pushkara, Gokarna and Somnatha-Prabhasa. This list of Kalidasa gives a "clear indication of tirthas celebrated in his day", states Diana Eck – an Indologist known for her publications on historic Indian pilgrimage sites.

History

The site of Somnath has been a pilgrimage site from ancient times on account of being a Triveni Sangam (the confluence of three rivers: Kapila, Hiran and Saraswati). Soma, the Moon god, is believed to have lost his lustre due to a curse, and he bathed in the Sarasvati River at this site to regain it. The result is said to be the waxing and waning of the moon. The name of the town, Prabhas, meaning lustre, as well as the alternative names Someshvar and Somnath ("the lord of the moon" or "the moon god"), arise from this tradition. 

The name Someshvara begins to appear starting in the 9th century. The Gurjara-Pratihara king Nagabhata II recorded that he has visited tirthas in Saurashtra, including Someshvara. Romila Thapar states that this does not imply the existence of a temple, but rather that it was a pilgrimage site (tirtha).  The Chaulukya (Solanki) king Mularaja possibly built the first temple for Soma at the site sometime before 997 CE, even though some historians believe that he may have renovated a smaller earlier temple.

The post-1950 excavations of the Somnath site have unearthed the earliest known version of the Somnath temple. The excavations showed the foundations of a 10th-century temple, notable broken parts and details of a major, well decorated version of a temple. Madhusudan Dhaky believes it to have been the one that was destroyed by Mahmud of Ghazni.
B.K. Thapar, the archaeologist who did the excavation, stated that there was definitely a temple structure at Somnath-Patan in the 9th-century, but none  before.

In 1026, during the reign of Bhima I, the Turkic Muslim ruler Mahmud of Ghazni raided and plundered the Somnath temple, broke its jyotirlinga. He took away a booty of 20 million dinars. According to Romila Thapar, relying on a 1038 inscription of a Kadamba king of Goa, the condition of Somnath temple in 1026 after Ghazni's is unclear because the inscription is "puzzlingly silent" about Ghazni's raid or temple's condition. This inscription, states Thapar, could suggest that instead of destruction it may have been a desecration because the temple seems to have been repaired quickly within twelve years and was an active pilgrimage site by 1038.

The raid of 1026 by the Turkic Muslim ruler Mahmud of Ghazni is confirmed by the 11th-century Persian historian Al-Biruni, who worked in the court of Mahmud, who accompanied Mahmud's troops between 1017 and 1030 CE on some occasions, and who lived in the northwest Indian subcontinent region – over regular intervals, though not continuously. The invasion of Somnath site in 1026 CE is also confirmed by other Islamic historians such as Gardizi, Ibn Zafir and Ibn al-Athir. However, two Persian sources – one by adh-Dhahabi and other by al-Yafi'i – state it as 1027 CE, which is likely incorrect and late by a year, according to Khan – a scholar known for his studies on Al-Biruni and other Persian historians. According to Al-Biruni:

Al-Biruni states that Mahmud destroyed the Somnath temple. He states Mahmud's motives as, "raids undertaken with a view to plunder and to satisfy the righteous iconoclasm of a true Muslim... [he] returned to Ghazna laden with costly spoils from the Hindu temples." Al-Biruni obliquely criticizes these raids for "ruining the prosperity" of India, creating antagonism among the Hindus for "all foreigners", and triggering an exodus of scholars of Hindu sciences far away from regions "conquered by us". Mahmud launched many plunder campaigns into India, including one that included the sack of Somnath temple.

According to Jamal Malik – a South Asian history and Islamic Studies scholar, "the destruction of Somnath temple, a well known place of pilgrimage in Gujarat in 1026, played a major role in creating Mahmud as an "icon of Islam", the sack of this temple became "a crucial topic in Persian stories of Islamic iconoclasm". Many Muslim historians and scholars in and after the 11th-century included the destruction of Somnath as a righteous exemplary deed in their publications. It inspired the Persian side with a cultural memory of Somnath's destruction through "epics of conquest", while to the Hindu side, Somnath inspired tales of recovery, rebuilding and "epics of resistance". These tales and chronicles in Persia elevated Mahmud as "the exemplary hero and Islamic warrior for the Muslims", states Malik, while in India Mahmud emerged as the exemplary "arch-enemy".

Powerful legends with intricate detail developed in the Turko-Persian literature regarding Mahmud's raid, which "electrified" the Muslim world according to scholar Meenakshi Jain. According to historian Cynthia Talbot, a later tradition states that "50,000 devotees lost their lives in trying to stop Mahmud" during his sack of Somnath temple. According to Thapar, the "50000 killed" is a boastful claim that is "constantly reiterated" in Muslim texts, and becomes a "formulaic" figure of deaths to help highlight "Mahmud’s legitimacy in the eyes of established Islam".

Kumarapala (r. 1143–72) rebuilt the Somnath temple in "excellent stone and studded it with jewels," according to an inscription in 1169. He replaced a decaying wooden temple.

During its 1299 invasion of Gujarat, Alauddin Khalji's army, led by Ulugh Khan, defeated the Vaghela king Karna, and sacked the Somnath temple. Legends in the later texts Kanhadade Prabandha (15th century) and Nainsi ri Khyat (17th century) state that the Jalore ruler Kanhadadeva later recovered the Somnath idol and freed the Hindu prisoners, after an attack on the Delhi army near Jalore. However, other sources state that the idol was taken to Delhi, where it was thrown to be trampled under the feet of Muslims. These sources include the contemporary and near-contemporary texts including Amir Khusrau's Khazainul-Futuh, Ziauddin Barani's Tarikh-i-Firuz Shahi and Jinaprabha Suri's Vividha-tirtha-kalpa. It is possible that the story of Kanhadadeva's rescue of the Somnath idol is a fabrication by the later writers. Alternatively, it is possible that the Khalji army was taking multiple idols to Delhi, and Kanhadadeva's army retrieved one of them.

The temple was rebuilt by Mahipala I, the Chudasama  king of Saurashtra in 1308 and the lingam was installed by his son Khengara sometime between 1331 and 1351. As late as the 14th century, Gujarati Muslim pilgrims were noted by Amir Khusrow to stop at that temple to pay their respects before departing for the Hajj pilgrimage.
In 1395, the temple was destroyed for the third time by Zafar Khan, the last governor of Gujarat under the Delhi Sultanate and later founder of Gujarat Sultanate. In 1451, it was desecrated by Mahmud Begada, the Sultan of Gujarat.

By 1665, the temple, one of many, was ordered to be destroyed by Mughal emperor Aurangzeb. In 1702, he ordered that if Hindus revived worship there, it should be demolished completely.

British Raj

In 1842, Edward Law, 1st Earl of Ellenborough issued his Proclamation of the Gates, in which he ordered the British army in Afghanistan to return via Ghazni and bring back to India the sandalwood gates from the tomb of Mahmud of Ghazni in Ghazni, Afghanistan. These were believed to have been taken by Mahmud from Somnath. Under Ellenborough's instruction, General William Nott removed the gates in September 1842. A whole sepoy regiment, the 6th Jat Light Infantry, was detailed to carry the gates back to India in triumph. However, on arrival, they were found not to be of Gujarati or Indian design, and not of Sandalwood, but of Deodar wood (native to Ghazni) and therefore not authentic to Somnath. They were placed in the arsenal store-room of the Agra Fort where they still lie to the present day. There was a debate in the House of Commons in London in 1843 on the question of the gates of the temple and Ellenbourough's role in the affair. After much crossfire between the British Government and the opposition, all of the facts as we know them were laid out.

In the 19th century novel The Moonstone by Wilkie Collins, the diamond of the title is presumed to have been stolen from the temple at Somnath and, according to the historian Romila Thapar, reflects the interest aroused in Britain by the gates. Her recent work on Somnath examines the evolution of the historiographies about the legendary Gujarat temple.

Reconstruction during 1950–1951

Before independence, Veraval was part of the Junagadh State, whose ruler had acceded to Pakistan in 1947. India contested the accession and annexed the state after holding a referendum. India's Deputy Prime Minister Vallabhbhai Patel came to Junagadh on 12 November 1947 to direct the stabilization of the state by the Indian Army, at which time he ordered the reconstruction of the Somnath temple.

When Patel, K. M. Munshi and other leaders of the Congress went to Mahatma Gandhi with their proposal to reconstruct the Somnath temple, Gandhi blessed the move but suggested that the funds for the construction should be collected from the public, and the temple should not be funded by the state. He expressed that he was proud to associate himself to the project of renovation of the temple. However, soon both Gandhi and Sardar Patel died, and the task of reconstruction of the temple continued under Munshi, who was the Minister for Food and Civil Supplies, Government of India headed by Prime Minister Jawaharlal Nehru.

The ruins were pulled down in October 1950. The mosque present at that site was shifted few kilometres away by using construction vehicles. On 11 May 1951, Rajendra Prasad, the first President of the Republic of India, invited by K M Munshi, performed the installation ceremony for the temple.

Description

Temple architecture
Pre-11th century temple
The floor plan and ruins of a pre-1000 CE temple were unearthed during the archaeological excavations led by B.K. Thapar. Most of the temple is lost, but the remains of the foundation, the lower structure as well as pieces of the temple ruins suggest an "exquisitely carved, rich" temple. According to Dhaky – a scholar of Indian temple architecture, this is the earliest known version of the Somnath temple. It was, what historic Sanskrit vastu sastra texts call the tri-anga sandhara prasada. Its garbhagriha (sanctum) was connected to a mukhamandapa (entrance hall) and gudhamandapa.

The temple opened to the east. The stylobate of this destroyed temple had two parts: the 3 feet high pitha-socle and the vedibandha-podium. The pitha had a tall bhitta, joined to the jadyakumbha, ornamented with what Dhaky calls "crisp and charming foliage pattern". The kumbha of the Vedibandha had a Surasenaka with a niche that contained the figure of Lakulisa – this evidence affirms that the lost temple was a Shiva temple.

The excavations yielded pieces of one at the western end, which suggests that the kumbhas were aligned to the entire wall. Above the kalaga moulding was an antarapatta, states Dhaky, but no information is available to determine its design or ornamentation. The surviving fragment of the kapotapali that was discovered suggests that at "intervals, it was decorated with contra-posed half thakaras, with large, elegant, and carefully shaped gagarakas in suspension graced the lower edge of the kapotapali", states Dhaky. The garbhagriha had a vedibandha, possibly with a two-layered jangha with images on the main face showing the influence of the late Maha-Maru style. Another fragment found had a "beautifully moulded rounded pillarette and a ribbed khuraccadya-awning topped the khattaka".

The mukhachatuski, states Dhaky, likely broke and fell immediately after the destructive hit by Mahmud's troops. These fragments suffered no further erosion or damage one would normally expect, likely because it was left in the foundation pit of the new Somnath temple that was rebuilt quickly after Mahmud left. The "quality of craftsmanship" in these fragments is "indeed high", the carvings of the lost temple were "rich and exquisite", states Dhaky. Further, a few pieces have an inscription fragment in the 10th-century characters – which suggests that this part of the temple or the entire temple was built in the 10th-century.

19th-century ruined Somnath temple partly converted into mosque
The efforts of colonial era archaeologists, photographers and surveyors have yielded several reports on the architecture and arts seen at the Somnath temple ruins in the 19th century. The earliest survey reports of Somnath temple and the condition of the Somanatha-Patan-Veraval town in the 19th-century were published between 1830 and 1850 by British officers and scholars. Alexander Burnes surveyed the site in 1830, calling Somnath site as "far-famed temple and city". He wrote:

He states that the site shows how the temple had been changed into a Muslim structure with arch, these sections had been reconstructed with "mutilated pieces of the temple's exterior" and "inverted Hindu images". Such modifications in the dilapidated Somnath temple to make it into a "Mohammedan sanctuary", states Burnes, is "proof of Mohammedan devastation" of this site. Burnes also summarized some of the mythologies he heard, the bitter communal sentiments and accusations, as well as the statements by garrisoned "Arabs of the Junagar [Junagadh] chief" about their victories in this "infidel land".

The survey report of Captain Postans was published in 1846. He states:

A more detailed survey report of Somnath temple ruins was published in 1931 by Henry Cousens. Cousens states that the Somnath temple is dear to the Hindu consciousness, its history and lost splendor remembered by them, and no other temple in Western India is "so famous in the annals of Hinduism as the temple of Somanatha at Somanatha-Pattan". The Hindu pilgrims walk to the ruins here and visit it along with their pilgrimage to Dwarka, Gujarat, though it has been reduced to a 19th-century site of gloom, full of "ruins and graves". His survey report states:

Present temple
The present temple is a Māru-Gurjara architecture (also called Chaulukya or Solanki style) temple. It has a "Kailash Mahameru Prasad" form, and reflects the skill of the Sompura Salats, one of Gujarat's master masons.

The architect of the new Somnath temple was Prabhashankarbhai Oghadbhai Sompura, who worked on recovering and integrating the old recoverable parts with the new design in the late 1940s and early 1950s. The new Somnath temple is intricately carved, two level temple with pillared mandapa and 212 relief panels.

According to Ananda Coomaraswamy – an art and architecture historian, the earlier Somnath temple ruin followed the Solanki-style, which is Nagara architecture inspired by the Vesara ideas found in Western regions of India.

Artwork
The rebuilt temple as found in the ruined form in the 19th-century and the current temple used recovered parts of previous temple with significant artwork. The new temple has added and integrated the new panels with a few old ones, the color of the stone distinguishing the two. The panels and pillars with historic artwork were and are found in the south and southwest side of the Somnath temple.

In general, the reliefs and sculpture is mutilated, to the point that it is difficult for most to "identify the few images that remain" on panels, states Cousens. An original Nataraja (Tandava Shiva), albeit with chopped arms and defaced, can be seen on the south side. A mutilated Nandi is to the right. To the left of this are traces of Shiva-Parvati, with the goddess seated in his lap. Towards the north-east corner, portions of panels in a band similar to Ramayana scenes in historic Hindu temples can be traced.  Sections can be seen with "beautiful vertical mouldings, on either side of the main front doorway", states Cousens, and this suggests that the destroyed temple was "exceedingly richly carved". The temple likely had a galaxy of Vedic and Puranic deities, as one of the partially surviving relief shows Surya's iconography – two lotuses in his hand.

The older temple featured an open plan, with great windows that allow light into the mandapa and circumambulation passage. The intricate and detailed artwork inside and on the pillars of Somnath temple were quite similar to those found in the Luna Vasahi temple at Mount Abu.

Tirtha and festivals
The Somnath-Prabhasa tirtha has been one of the revered tirtha (pilgrimage) site for the Hindus. It is the famed Prabhasa site found in Brahmi script inscriptions in Maharashtra sites. It is mentioned in the poems of Kalidasa. The new temple is the top pilgrimage site in Gujarat along with Dwarka.

Archaeological studies
The Somnath temple site and coastline has been excavated for archaeological evidence by Indian teams. The first major excavation was completed in 1950–51 just before the Somnath temple was reconstructed. It was led by B. K. Thapar, one of the Director General of Archaeological Survey of India, and a report published. This Thapar study yielded direct and substantial evidence of a 10th-century or earlier large temple. B. K. Thapar estimated the older temple to be from the 9th-century, while Dhaky states to more likely from the 10th-century, i.e. from 960 to 973 CE. The Thapar study also found artifacts and ruins with ancient scripts such as Brahmi and later scripts such as proto-Nagari and Nagari, thus confirming the antiquity of Somnath-Patan through at least much of the 1st-millennium.

A few Somnath-Patan sites around the Somnath temple was excavated in the 1970s, led by M. K. Dhavalikar and Z. D. Ansari. They dug deeper at several locations, reported evidence of five periods of human settlement. In 1992, M. K. Dhavalikar and Gregory Possehl – an archaeologist known for his Indus Valley studies, reported their analysis of archaeological discoveries from Prabhas-Patan. According to them, the Somnath site shows evidence of ancient human settlement, from pre-2nd millennium BCE period. They date one period to "pre-Harappan phase". However, these discoveries are all ceramics, wares and jewelry (amulet), and they found no ancient "temple parts". According to Charles Herman's critical review, the evidence available so far does not allow any direct inferences about the society and culture in pre-1st millennium BCE era, but there is persuasive evidence that Prabhas-Patan was an early Harappan site with sedentary farming and cattle keeping and it is in the same league of significance as the Dholavira (Kutch) and Rojdi (Sorath-Harappan) archaeological sites. Further, the Prabhas-Patan mounds that have been excavated show evidence of continued post-Harappan settlement (c. 2000– 1800 BCE) along with several other Saurashtra sites. According to Herman, the archaeological excavations in Prabhas-Patan and Saurashtra region have been too few to make systematic conclusions.

Legacy

Iran
The Somnath temple has inspired different narratives and legacies, for some a symbol of blessed conquest and victories, for some a symbol of fanatical intolerance and persecution. After the 1026 sack of the Somnath temple, states Mehrdad Shokoohy, the "sack of Somnath was not just yet another campaign of a medieval Sultan confined to histories, but a symbol of the revival of Iranian identity boosted by religious zeal, which was to echo in literature and folklore" for nearly one thousand years. The destruction of the Somnath temple – called Sūmanāt in Persian literature, and the killing of the infidels has been portrayed as a celebrated event in numerous versions of history, stories and poems found in Persia written over the centuries. The Persian literature has made mythical ahistorical connections of Somnath to Manat. The destruction of both has been celebrated by the Islamic scholars and elites.

India
On the Indian side, the Somnath temple has been more than another house of worship. For Hindus, particularly Hindu nationalists, it is a question of their heritage, their sense of sacred time and space, states Peter van der Veer. Its history raises questions of tolerance and spiritual values to expect, and of a symbol of fanaticism and foreign oppression. The Somnath temple has been leveraged to revisit India's history and agitate over its sacred spaces including contested sites such as Ayodhya. Mahmud and Aurangzeb along with the ideology that inspired them are remembered as enemies of the ancient Hindu nation. They are asserted as two historical facts, the former as the first and the latter as the last systematic destroyers of Somnath temple.

The Somnath temple was used as a cultural symbol and the starting point for a Rath yatra (chariot journey), states K.N. Pannikkar, by Lal Krishna Advani to begin his Ayodhya campaign in 1990. According to Donald Smith, the reconstruction efforts in the 1950s was not about restoring an ancient architecture, rather the Somnath temple was of religious significance. The rebuilding was a symbol, it was Hindu repudiation of almost a thousand years of Muslim domination, oppression, and reassertion of a safe haven for Hindus in post-partitioned India.

The reconstructed Somnath temple has been the preferred pilgrimage site for Hindus in Gujarat, often combined with a pilgrimage to Dwarka. The site attracts Hindus from all over India, states David Sopher.

Pakistan and West Asia
In the modern era textbooks of Pakistan, the sack of Somnath temple is praised and the campaign of Sultan Mahmud of Ghaznavi is glorified as a "champion of Islam". According to Syed Zaidi – a scholar of Islamist Militancy, a school book in Pakistan titled Our World portrays Somnath temple as a "place where all the Hindu rajas used to get together" and think about "fighting the Muslims". Mahmud went to this temple and "blew the idol in pieces" and "this success was a source of happiness for the whole Muslim world". Another textbook for Pakistan's Middle School repeats a similar narrative, teaching its students that the Somnath temple was not really a Hindu temple but a political center. According to Ashok Behuria and Mohammad Shehzad, the Somnath legacy is narrated in this textbook as, "according to most historians Mahmud invaded India seventeen times to crush the power of the Hindu Rajas and Maharajas who were always busy planning conspiracies against him ... After the fall of Punjab, the Hindus assembled at Somnath — which was more of a political centre than a temple — to plan a big war against Mahmud. He took all the Rajas and Maharajas by surprise when he attacked Somnath and crushed the Hindu headquarter of political intrigue. With the destruction of Somnath he broke the backbone of the Hindus in the region and thus had no need to attack India again".

In Islamic State nationalist literature of the modern era, Sultan Mahmud campaign in the 11th-century has been glorified as a historic "jihad against non-Muslims", his motive in destroying Somnath temple is described as "not driven by worldly gain [wealth]", but because he wanted to "end the worship of idols".

Afghanistan
In 1842, during the First Anglo-Afghan war, the Governor-General of India Lord Ellenborough ordered his troops to bring the wooden gates from the tomb of Mahmud of Ghazni in Ghazni, Afghanistan back to India; it was believed Mahmud had taken them from Somnath Temple. However, there was nor there is any evidence that Somnath temple or its site ever had any wooden gates. Nor is there any evidence that Mahmud or later conquerors ever took any gates from Prabhas-Patan region as a part of the plunder. This order has been called the Proclamation of the Gates. The order, states Thapar, is best seen as an example of how "colonial intervention in India" was viewed in the 1840s.

Gallery

See also
 Bhalka
 Conversion of non-Islamic places of worship into mosques
 Kashi Vishwanath Temple
 Dwarka

Notes

References

Bibliography

 
 

 
 
 .

Further reading
 Somnath: The Shrine Eternal - by K M.Munshi
Meenakshi Jain (2019), Flight of Deities and Rebirth of Temples, ABI Prints & Publishing
Kavita Singh (2010), "The Temple's Eternal Return: Swaminarayan Akshardham Complex in Delhi", pp. 73–75,Artibus Asiae, Vol 70, no. 1, academia.edu

External links

 Somnath Temple Official Website 

Jyotirlingas
Hindu temples in Gujarat
Gir Somnath district
Destroyed temples
Shiva temples in Gujarat
Māru-Gurjara architecture